Henry Klein (born September 17, 1952) a racewalker who represents the United States Virgin Islands. He competed in the men's 20 kilometres walk at the 1976 Summer Olympics.  He also competed in the 50K race walk at the 1976 World Championships in Athletics.  The first ever World Championships in Athletics was necessitated by the International Olympic Committee eliminating the 50 kilometers race walk from the Olympic program in 1976.

As Hank Klein, he has continued as an active race walker in Masters athletics competitions.

References

1952 births
Living people
Athletes (track and field) at the 1976 Summer Olympics
United States Virgin Islands male racewalkers
Olympic track and field athletes of the United States Virgin Islands
Athletes (track and field) at the 1979 Pan American Games
Pan American Games competitors for the United States Virgin Islands
Place of birth missing (living people)